Robert Howden (28 March 1917 – 1 May 2004) was a South African cricketer who made three first-class appearances. Other members of his family have played cricket, including former South African captains Graeme Pollock (his nephew) and Shaun Pollock (his great nephew).

He was born in Durban, Natal and died in Durban North, KwaZulu-Natal.

External links

1917 births
2004 deaths
South African cricketers
KwaZulu-Natal cricketers